The Kindred is a 1987 American horror film directed by Jeffrey Obrow and Stephen Carpenter. Obrow also produced the film, and co-wrote it along with Carpenter, Earl Ghaffari and John Penney. Starring David Allen Brooks, Amanda Pays and Rod Steiger, The Kindred was released on January 9, 1987 and grossed just over $2 million.

Plot
Amanda's deathbed request to her son, John, was for him to destroy all the lab notes from her last experiment. She also blurts out he had a brother. At the funeral John meets Melissa, who claims to be his mother's biggest fan. Together with some of John's friends they go to Amanda's house, but none are prepared for what they find there: his monstrous, tentacled baby brother. Now he has to get to his mother's greatest advancement in Human Evolution before a mad scientist gets to him first.

Cast
 David Allen Brooks as John Hollins
 Rod Steiger as Dr. Phillip Lloyd
 Amanda Pays as Melissa Leftridge
 Talia Balsam as Sharon Raymond
 Kim Hunter as Amanda Hollins
 Timothy Gibbs as Hart Phillips
 Peter Frechette as Brad Baxter
 Julia Montgomery as Cindy Russell
 Bunky Jones as Nell Valentine (as Bunki Z)
 Charles Grueber as Harry
 Bennet Guillory as Dr. Stone
 Edgar Small as Dr. Larson
 Jim Boeke as Jackson (as James Boeke)
 Randy Harrington as Paramedic
 Benjamin J. Perry as Porsche Driver (as Ben Perry)

Production
Principal photography began and wrapped in California, United States.

Release
The film began its theatrical release on January 9, 1987.

After over a decade of work and legal tangles, Synapse Films announced in September 2017 that they would release the film for the first time since its VHS run. It was released on Blu-ray and DVD in a limited SteelBook edition of 3 500 units on December 14, 2021, from a new 4K resolution scan.

Reception

Caryn James at The New York Times called the film "a disjointed, jigsaw-puzzle movie that is constantly announcing its borrowed characters and subplots and special effects." TV Guide awarded The Kindred one out of five stars, criticizing the film's plot as "overly complicated and unengaging" and its special effects as uneven.

Brian J. Dillard from Allmovie stated that The Kindred "remains watchable in spite of its weaknesses," commending the film's visual effects, music, and Gothic trappings. However, Dilliard criticized the film's numerous plot holes.

References

External links

 
 
 

1987 films
1987 horror films
1980s science fiction horror films
American supernatural horror films
American science fiction horror films
Films shot in California
Mad scientist films
American science fiction thriller films
Films with screenplays by Joseph Stefano
1980s English-language films
Films directed by Jeffrey Obrow
1980s American films